Ridgeview may refer to:

Places:
Ridgeview, Durban, residential area in central Durban, KwaZulu-Natal, South Africa
Ridgeview, Indiana, unincorporated community in Miami County, Indiana
Ridgeview, Ottawa, neighbourhood in Ottawa, Canada
Ridgeview, Boone County, West Virginia, unincorporated community in Boone County, West Virginia, United States
Ridgeview, Logan County, West Virginia, unincorporated community in Logan County, West Virginia, United States
Ridgeview, South Dakota, unincorporated community in Dewey County, South Dakota, United States
Ridgeview Village, California, unincorporated community in El Dorado County, California

Schools:
Ridgeview classical schools, small charter school located in Fort Collins, Colorado
Ridgeview Elementary School (Tennessee)
Ridgeview High School (Bakersfield, California)
Ridgeview High School (Florida)
Ridgeview High School (Redmond, Oregon)
Ridgeview Middle School (Maryland)
Ridgeview Middle School (Ohio)
Ridgeview Middle School (Oromocto, New Brunswick)
Ridgeview Middle School (Texas)
Ridgeview School on the northern fringe of Auckland, New Zealand

See also
Ridgeville (disambiguation)
Ridgeway View
Ridgeview Public Library, historic former library at Hickory, Catawba County, North Carolina